Enzo Francesco Guerrero Segovia (born 31 January 1991) is a Chilean footballer who plays as a defender for Chilean Primera División side Ñublense.

International career
He represented Chile U20 at the 2011 South American U-20 Championship, making appearances in six matches.

Honours

Club
Coquimbo Unido
 Primera B: 2014-C

Palestino
 Copa Chile: 2018

References

External links
 
 

1991 births
Living people
People from Elqui Province
Chilean footballers
Coquimbo Unido footballers
Cobreloa footballers
Deportes Iquique footballers
Club Deportivo Palestino footballers
Ñublense footballers
Chilean Primera División players
Primera B de Chile players
Chile youth international footballers
Chile under-20 international footballers
Association football defenders